The qualification for the 1956 AFC Asian Cup consisted of 19 teams separated in three zones. The winner of each zone would join hosts Hong Kong in the final tournament. Qualification was done on a two-legged format, home and away games.

Central zone

First round 

|}

First leg

Second leg 

Malaya won 11–5 on aggregate.

Second round 

|}

First leg

Second leg 

South Vietnam won 7–3 on aggregate.

Third round 

|}

Eastern zone

First round 

|}

Second round 

|}

First leg

Second leg 

South Korea won 5–0 on aggregate.

Third round 

|}

First leg

Second leg

South Korea won 4–1 on aggregate.

Western zone

First round 

|}

Second round 

|}

Third round 

|}

Qualified teams

Goal scorers 
10 Goals
 Abdul Ghani Minhat

3 Goals
 Pang Siang Hock

2 Goals
 Trần Văn Nhung
 Đỗ Quang Thách
 Nguyễn Văn Tu
 Nguon Tuy
 Lung
 Choi Jung-min
 Woo Sang-kwon
 Kim Hong-woo
 Kim Dong-keun

1 Goal
 Lê Hữu Đức
 Reith Peon
 Chu Wing-keung
 Sung Nak-woon

References 

 Jovanovic, Bojan; Panahi, Majeed; Veroeveren, Pieter. "Asian Nations Cup 1956". RSSSF.

AFC Asian Cup qualification
Afc Asian Cup Qualification, 1956
Afc Asian Cup Qualification, 1956
Afc Asian Cup Qualification, 1956
Afc Asian Cup Qualification, 1956
Afc Asian Cup Qualification, 1956
Afc Asian Cup Qualification, 1956
Q